Jose Callangan Calida (born July 7, 1950) is a Filipino lawyer. He previously served as Undersecretary of Justice under the Arroyo administration, as executive director of the Dangerous Drugs Board, as Solicitor General of the Philippines under the Duterte administration, and as the Chairman of Commission on Audit (COA) under the administration of President Bongbong Marcos.

Life and education
Calida was born in Nuevo Iloco, Davao (present-day Mawab, Davao de Oro). A born again Christian, he is married to Milagros Parantar Ordaneza who is also from Davao with whom he has three children.

Calida holds a Doctor of Philosophy degree in English from the Ateneo de Davao University in 1969. He studied law at the Ateneo de Manila University Law School where he was a dean's lister. He graduated in 1973 and was admitted to the Bar the following year with a general average of 83.25 percent (the highest grade of 100 percent in Criminal Law, 90 percent in Civil Law and 90 percent in Taxation) in the 1974 Philippine Bar Examination.

Calida is a member of the Aquila Legis Fraternity.

Career
Calida is a practicing lawyer and founding partner of J. Calida & Associates law firm based in Davao del Sur. He served as secretary general of the Volunteers Against Crime and Corruption during the administration of President Fidel Ramos and was the convenor of the God's People's Coalition for Righteousness that staged protests and prayer rallies against the proliferation of pornography and smut films in the 1990s. In 1997, he led the group called Support the Initiatives for the Good of the Nation or SIGN which pushed for Charter Change through people's initiative and helped the Pirma movement gather signatures to allow then President Fidel Ramos to run for reelection through a plebiscite. He also co-founded the party list group called Citizens' Battle Against Corruption and served as its president in 1997.

Calida was a member of the prosecution team during the impeachment trial of President Joseph Estrada in 2000. Following the Second EDSA Revolution, he was appointed by the newly installed President Gloria Macapagal Arroyo as the Undersecretary of the Department of Justice (DOJ) under Secretaries Hernando B. Perez in 2001, Merceditas Gutierrez in 2002, and Simeon Datumanong in 2003. As Justice Undersecretary, he was in charge of the National Bureau of Investigation, the Office of the Government Corporate Counsel, the DOJ Task Force on Corruption and Internal Security, and the DOJ Task Force on Financial Fraud and Money Laundering. In 2004, he assumed the leadership of the Dangerous Drugs Board as the agency's executive director.

Calida returned to private law and business after leaving government service in October 2004. He was president and chair of Vigilant Investigative and Security Agency, which won a contract with the Philippine Amusement and Gaming Corporation in 2010. He also served as senior vice president of the insurance company Prudential Guarantee and Assurance Inc. Calida was endorsed by then Davao City Vice Mayor Rodrigo Duterte as a candidate for the Ombudsman post in 2011. Prior to his return to government service, he was also one of the campaign managers of the 2016 Duterte-Marcos presidential-vice presidential campaign. President Duterte has described Calida as "passionately... pro-Marcos."

Calida faces criminal and administrative charges at the Office of the Ombudsman. According to one of the charges, Calida allegedly violated the Code of Conduct and Ethical Standards for Public Officials and Employees for failing to divest his interest in his family-owned security agency, which received  worth of contracts from the Department of Justice and other government agencies. Calida has denied any conflict of interest and said he is not liable under the Code of Conduct for Public Officials nor the anti-graft law.

Calida was reported to be the second highest-paid government official in 2019, earning  according to a report from Commission on Audit (COA).

Calida was appointed by President-elect Bongbong Marcos as the Chairman of Commission on Audit (COA) on June 29, 2022; he assumed the post on July 4. However, his appointment was bypassed by the Commission on Appointments (CA) on September 28 and he was not reappointed by Marcos. Calida resigned from the post on October 4 due to undisclosed reasons; he was replaced by Gamaliel Cordoba.

See also 
ABS-CBN franchise renewal controversy
National Telecommunications Commission

References 

|-

1950 births
20th-century Filipino lawyers
Filipino business executives
Filipino Christians
Living people
Solicitors General of the Philippines
Heads of government agencies of the Philippines
People from Davao de Oro
People from Davao del Sur
Ateneo de Davao University alumni
Ateneo de Manila University alumni
Arroyo administration personnel
Duterte administration personnel
21st-century Filipino lawyers